White deer or White Deer may refer to:

Animals
 Seneca white deer
 White stag, a red deer with leucism
 An albino deer of any species

Places
 White Deer, Texas, United States
 White Deer Creek, in Pennsylvania, United States
 White Deer Township, Union County, Pennsylvania, United States

Other uses
 The White Deer, a children's novel by James Thurber
 Bijeli jelen / "White Deer" (1947) by Vladimir Nazor

See also
 White Hart